The Mġarr phase is one of the eleven phases of Maltese prehistory. It is named for the town of Mġarr, in the west of the island, where pottery older than the Ta' Ħaġrat temple complex was found.

The Mġarr phase, approximately 3800-3600 BCE, follows the Żebbuġ phase in the Temple period, and precedes the three phases, the Ġgantija, Saflieni and Tarxien phases, during which the principal megalithic temples of Malta were built.

References

Neolithic cultures of Europe
Pre-Indo-Europeans
Megalithic Temples of Malta
Maltese prehistory
Archaeological cultures of Southern Europe
Archaeological cultures in Malta